Sociedad General de Televisión Cuatro, S.A.U. (Sogecuatro) was a Spanish media company that operated the Spanish television channel Cuatro. It operated as a subsidiary of the audiovisual division (Sogecable) of the Spanish media conglomerate PRISA.

On May 28, 2010 the Council of Ministers authorised the transfer of the broadcasting license from Sogecable to their subsidiary.

On December 28, 2010 parent company PRISA TV sold Sogecuatro to Gestevisión Telecinco, now known as Mediaset España Comunicación, for 485 million euros and a 17.3% stake in the buying company.

References

Companies based in the Community of Madrid
Spanish companies established in 2010
Companies disestablished in 2011
Spanish brands